I Want to Live is a hotline for receiving appeals from Russian servicemen in Ukraine. Operated by the Main Directorate of Intelligence of Ukraine, the service is designed to help Russian servicemen who do not want to participate in the Russian invasion of Ukraine to safely surrender to the Ukrainian Armed Forces. The project guarantees the detention of surrendering military personnel in accordance with the Geneva Conventions.

Process
According to the official website of the project, there are several methods by which a Russian serviceman can submit an appeal and surrender. These include calling the round-the-clock hotline, or following instructions from a chatbot on a channel of the project. Since shortly after the launch of the project, Russian state bodies blocked access to it from the territories controlled by the Russian Federation.

History
On September 18, the coordination headquarters for the treatment of prisoners of war, as a continuation of the project designed to inform the Russian military about the possibility of laying down weapons and preserving their lives, launched a special state project with a 24-hour hotline for receiving appeals from the Russian military and their families called "I want to Live."

On October 5, 2022, it became known that with the help of this project, the first Russian serviceman who was mobilized immediately after the announced partial mobilization in Russia surrendered to the Armed Forces of Ukraine.

During the first month of the project more than three thousand calls from Russian military personnel were processed.

See also

 Look for Your Own

References

2022 Russian invasion of Ukraine
Telephone numbers in Ukraine
Ukrainian websites
Reactions to the 2022 Russian invasion of Ukraine
2022 establishments in Ukraine